The maximum power principle or Lotka's principle has been proposed as the fourth principle of energetics in open system thermodynamics, where an example of an open system is a biological cell. According to Howard T. Odum, "The maximum power principle can be stated: During self-organization, system designs develop and prevail that maximize power intake, energy transformation, and those uses that reinforce production and efficiency."

History
Chen (2006) has located the origin of the statement of maximum power as a formal principle in a tentative proposal by Alfred J. Lotka (1922a, b). Lotka's statement sought to explain the Darwinian notion of evolution with reference to a physical principle. Lotka's work was subsequently developed by the systems ecologist Howard T. Odum in collaboration with the chemical engineer Richard C. Pinkerton, and later advanced by the engineer Myron Tribus.

While Lotka's work may have been a first attempt to formalise evolutionary thought in mathematical terms, it followed similar observations made by Leibniz and Volterra and Ludwig Boltzmann, for example, throughout the sometimes controversial history of natural philosophy.  In contemporary literature it is most commonly associated with the work of Howard T. Odum.

The significance of Odum's approach was given greater support during the 1970s, amid times of oil crisis, where, as Gilliland (1978, pp. 100) observed, there was an emerging need for a new method of analysing the importance and value of energy resources to economic and environmental production. A field known as energy analysis, itself associated with net energy and EROEI, arose to fulfill this analytic need. However, in energy analysis intractable theoretical and practical difficulties arose when using the energy unit to understand, a) the conversion among concentrated fuel types (or energy types), b)  the contribution of labour, and c) the contribution of the environment.

Philosophy and theory
Lotka said (1922b: 151): 

Gilliland noted that these difficulties in analysis in turn required some new theory to adequately explain the interactions and transactions of these different energies (different concentrations of fuels, labour and environmental forces). Gilliland (Gilliland 1978, p. 101) suggested that Odum's statement of the maximum power principle (H.T.Odum 1978, pp. 54–87) was, perhaps, an adequate expression of the requisite theory:

This theory Odum called maximum power theory. In order to formulate maximum power theory Gilliland observed that Odum had added another law (the maximum power principle) to the already well established laws of thermodynamics. In 1978 Gilliland wrote that Odum's new law had not yet been validated (Gilliland 1978, p. 101). Gilliland stated that in maximum power theory the second law efficiency of thermodynamics required an additional physical concept: "the concept of second law efficiency under maximum power" (Gilliland 1978, p. 101):

 
     
In this way the concept of maximum power was being used as a principle to quantitatively describe the selective law of biological evolution. Perhaps H.T.Odum's most concise statement of this view was (1970, p. 62):

The Odum–Pinkerton approach to Lotka's proposal was to apply Ohm's law – and the associated maximum power theorem (a result in electrical power systems) – to ecological systems. Odum and Pinkerton defined "power" in electronic terms as the rate of work, where Work is understood as a "useful energy transformation". The concept of maximum power can therefore be defined as the maximum rate of useful energy transformation. Hence the underlying philosophy aims to unify the theories and associated laws of electronic and thermodynamic systems with biological systems. This approach presupposed an analogical view which sees the world as an ecological-electronic-economic engine.

Proposals for maximum power principle as 4th thermodynamic law

Definition in words

Odum et al. viewed the maximum power theorem as a principle of power-efficiency reciprocity selection with wider application than just electronics. For example, Odum saw it in open systems operating on solar energy, like both photovoltaics and photosynthesis (1963, p. 438). Like the maximum power theorem, Odum's statement of the maximum power principle relies on the notion of 'matching', such that high-quality energy maximizes power by matching and amplifying energy (1994, pp. 262, 541): "in surviving designs a matching of high-quality energy with larger amounts of low-quality energy is likely to occur" (1994, p. 260). As with electronic circuits, the resultant rate of energy transformation will be at a maximum at an intermediate power efficiency. In 2006, T.T. Cai, C.L. Montague and J.S. Davis said that, "The maximum power principle is a potential guide to understanding the patterns and processes of ecosystem development and sustainability. The principle predicts the selective persistence of ecosystem designs that capture a previously untapped energy source." (2006, p. 317). In several texts H.T. Odum gave the Atwood machine as a practical example of the 'principle' of maximum power.

Mathematical definition 
The mathematical definition given by H.T. Odum is formally analogous to the definition provided on the maximum power theorem article. (For a brief explanation of Odum's approach to the relationship between ecology and electronics see Ecological Analog of Ohm's Law)

Contemporary ideas
Whether or not the principle of maximum power efficiency can be considered the fourth law of thermodynamics and the fourth principle of energetics is moot. Nevertheless, H.T. Odum also proposed a corollary of maximum power as the organisational principle of evolution, describing the evolution of microbiological systems, economic systems, planetary systems, and astrophysical systems. He called this corollary the maximum empower principle.  This was suggested because, as S.E. Jorgensen, M.T. Brown, H.T. Odum (2004) note,

C. Giannantoni may have confused matters when he wrote "The "Maximum Em-Power Principle" (Lotka–Odum) is generally considered the "Fourth Thermodynamic Principle" (mainly) because of its practical validity for a very wide class of physical and biological systems" (C. Giannantoni 2002, § 13, p. 155). Nevertheless,  Giannantoni has proposed the Maximum Em-Power Principle as the fourth principle of thermodynamics (Giannantoni 2006).

The preceding discussion is incomplete. The "maximum power" was discovered several times independently, in physics and engineering, see: Novikov (1957), El-Wakil (1962), and Curzon and Ahlborn (1975). The incorrectness of this analysis and design evolution conclusions was demonstrated by Gyftopoulos (2002).

See also
 Maximum power theorem
 Maximum entropy thermodynamics
 Entropy production
 Exergy efficiency
 Energy conversion efficiency
 Energy rate density
 Exergy
 Jeremy England
 Free energy
 Emergy
 Systems ecology
 Ecological economics

References

 T.T. Cai, C.L. Montague and J.S. Davis (2006) 'The maximum power principle: An empirical investigation', Ecological Modelling, Volume 190, Issues 3–4, Pages 317–335
 G.Q. Chen (2006) 'Scarcity of exergy and ecological evaluation based on embodied exergy', Communications in Nonlinear Science and Numerical Simulation, Volume 11, Issue 4, July, Pages 531–552.
 R.Costanza, J.H.Cumberland, H.E.Daly, R.Goodland and R.B.Norgaard (1997) An Introduction to Ecological Economics, CRC Press – St. Lucie Press, First Edition.
 F.L.Curzon and B.Ahlborn (1975) 'Efficiency of a Carnot engine at maximum power output', Am J Phys, 43, pp. 22–24.
 C.Giannantoni (2002) The Maximum Em-Power Principle as the basis for Thermodynamics of Quality, Servizi Grafici Editoriali, Padova.
 C.Giannantoni (2006) Mathematics for generative processes: Living and non-living systems, Journal of Computational and Applied Mathematics, Volume 189, Issue 1–2, Pages 324–340.
 M.W.Gilliland ed. (1978) Energy Analysis: A New Public Policy Tool, AAA Selected Symposia Series, Westview Press, Boulder, Colorado.
 C.A.S.Hall (1995) Maximum Power: The ideas and applications of H.T.Odum, Colorado University Press.
 C.A.S.Hall (2004) 'The continuing importance of maximum power', Ecological Modelling, Volume 178, Issue 1–2, 15, Pages 107–113
 H.W. Jackson (1959) Introduction to Electronic Circuits, Prentice–Hall.
 S.E.Jorgensen, M.T.Brown, H.T.Odum (2004) 'Energy hierarchy and transformity in the universe', Ecological Modelling, 178, pp. 17–28
 A.L.Lehninger (1973) Bioenergetics, W.A. Benjamin inc.
 A.J.Lotka (1922a) 'Contribution to the energetics of evolution' [PDF]. Proc Natl Acad Sci, 8: pp. 147–51.
 A.J.Lotka (1922b) 'Natural selection as a physical principle' [PDF]. Proc Natl Acad Sci, 8, pp 151–4.
 H.T.Odum (1963) 'Limits of remote ecosystems containing man', The American Biology Teacher, Volume 25, No. 6, pp. 429–443.
 H.T.Odum (1970) Energy Values of Water Sources. in 19th Southern Water Resources and Pollution Control Conference.
 H.T.Odum (1978) 'Energy Quality and the Environment', in M.W.Gilliland ed. (1978) Energy Analysis: A New Public Policy Tool, AAA Selected Symposia Series, Westview Press, Boulder, Colorado.
 H.T.Odum (1994) Ecological and General Systems: An Introduction to Systems Ecology, Colorado University Press.
 H.T.Odum (1995) 'Self-Organization and Maximum Empower', in C.A.S.Hall (ed.) Maximum Power: The Ideas and Applications of H.T.Odum, Colorado University Press, Colorado.
 H.T.Odum and R.C.Pinkerton (1955) 'Time's speed regulator: The optimum efficiency for maximum output in physical and biological systems ', Am. Sci., 43 pp. 331–343.
 H.T.Odum and M.T.Brown (2007) Environment, Power and Society for the Twenty-First Century: The Hierarchy of Energy, Columbia University Press.
 M.Tribus (1961) § 16.11 'Generalized Treatment of Linear Systems Used for Power Production', Thermostatics and Thermodynamics, Van Nostrand, University Series in Basic Engineering, p. 619.
Novikov I. I., (1958). The efficiency of atomic power stations. J. Nuclear Energy II, Vol. 7, pp. 125–128; translated from Atomnaya Energia, Vol. 3, (1957), No. 11, p. 409
El-Wakil, M. M. (1962) Nuclear Power Engineering, McGraw-Hill, New York, pp. 162–165.
Curzon F. L., Ahlborn B., (1975) Efficiency of a Carnot engine at maximum power, American Journal of Physics, Vol. 43, pp. 22–24.
Gyftopoulos E. P., (2002). On the Curzon-Ahlborn efficiency and its lack of connection to power producing processes, Energy Conversion and Management, Vol. 43, pp. 609–615.

Energy
Thermodynamics
Principles